Vistan-e Pain (also Romanized as Vīstān-e Pā’īn, Veyestān-e Pā’īn, and Wistān Pāīn; also known as Wistān) is a village in Khorramdarreh Rural District, in the Central District of Khorramdarreh County, Zanjan Province, Iran. At the 2006 census, its population was 32, in 12 families.

References 

Populated places in Khorramdarreh County